Scymnodon is a genus of squaliform sharks in the family Somniosidae.

Species
There are currently four recognized species in this genus:
 Scymnodon ichiharai Ka. Yano & S. Tanaka (II), 1984 (Japanese velvet dogfish) 
 Scymnodon macracanthus (Regan, 1906) (largespine velvet dogfish)  
 Scymnodon plunketi (Waite, 1910) (Plunket's shark) 
 Scymnodon ringens Barbosa du Bocage & Brito Capello, 1864 (knifetooth dogfish)

References

 
Shark genera
Taxa named by José Vicente Barbosa du Bocage